Frederick Arthur Nettelbeck (November 9, 1950 – January 20, 2011) was an American poet. In the early 1970s he began work on a long poem that was published in 1979: Bug Death. Cut-up and collage texts were combined with original writing to create Bug Death. His literary magazine, This Is Important (1980–1997), published such writers as William S. Burroughs, Wanda Coleman, John M. Bennett, Jack Micheline, Allen Ginsberg, Robin Holcomb, Charles Bernstein, John Giorno, Greg Hall, etc. His other publication of note was a Small press mimeo magazine: Throb (1971), publishing Al Masarik, Susan Fromberg Schaeffer, Gerald Locklin, Joel Deutsch, and 'Charles Bukowski answers 10 easy questions'. Nettelbeck's work, publications, and papers are collected in the Ohio State University Avant Writing Collection and the Sackner Archive of Concrete and Visual Poetry. His autobiography is published in Contemporary Authors, Volume 184 (Gale Research). He lived in southern Oregon's Sprague River Valley.

Bibliography
 The Quick & The Dead (Freark Brownelbeck Press 1970)
 No Place Fast (Rough Life Press 1976)
 Destroy All Monsters (Konglomerati 1976)
 Curios (Quark Press 1976)
 Spectator (Drivel Press 1977)
 The Used Future (Alley Island Press 1978)
 Bug Death (Alcatraz Editions 1979)
 Bar Napkin Poems (Clown War 1982)
 Large Talk (road/house 1983)
 Americruiser (Illuminati 1983)
 The Kiss Off (Inkblot 1984)
 Hands On A Mirror (Inkblot 1987)
 Albert Ayler Disappeared (Inkblot 1989)
 Ecosystems Collapsing (Inkblot 1992)
 Everything Written Exists (Lucky Boy Publications 2004)
 Lap Gun Cut (with John M. Bennett) (Luna Bisonte Prods 2006)
 Don't Say A Word (Blue Press 2008)
 Taste the (with HEXIT/MjK) (If Year Books 2009)
 Someone Who Loved You (48th Street Press 2010)
 Drinking & Thinking (Blue Press 2010)
 Pesticide Drift (Argotist Ebooks 2010)
 Happy Hour (Four Minutes to Midnight 2010)

Further reading
 Bug Death: Punk Epic by Kate Braverman, Bachy 17 (A Journal of the Arts in Los Angeles), Papa Bach Editions, 1980 
 F. A. Nettelbeck: Emergence Of An Important Poetic Force an essay by Wanda Coleman, Bachy 17 (A Journal of the Arts in Los Angeles), Papa Bach Editions, 1980 
 F. A. Nettelbeck's Bug Death by Paul Mann, Atticus Review 4, Atticus Press, 1983
 The Year's Best In Poetry by Tom Clark, San Francisco Chronicle, Book Review Section, December 2, 1984
 Fetal Films: Two Books by F. A. Nettelbeck by Loris Essary, Menu, The Lunchroom Press, 1985 
 Of Politics: This Is Important edited by F. A. Nettelbeck by Jay Dougherty, Small Press Review, Dustbooks, September 1988 
 The Micropress: An Underground Economy Of Poetry by Joel Lewis, Poets & Writers Magazine, Poets & Writers, Inc., January/February 1992 
 F. A. Nettelbeck: Neglected Poems by Gustave Morin, Scan, Common Ground Editions, 1999
 Starving Poet Hungers For New Forms Of Poetry by Lee Juillerat, Herald and News, Klamath Falls, Oregon, December 12, 2000
 Charles Bukowski: Sunlight Here I Am - Interviews and Encounters, 1963-1993 edited by David Stephen Calonne, Sun Dog Press, 2003

See also

 List of concrete and visual poets
 List of poets from the United States

References

External links
 Obit.
 F. A. Nettelbeck OSU Guide and Inventory
 F. A. Nettelbeck Herald and News Profile

People from Cicero, Illinois
People from Bend, Oregon
20th-century American poets
Poets from Illinois
Poets from Oregon
1950 births
2011 deaths
21st-century American poets
Visual poets